E3A may refer to:
 Y-DNA haplogroup E3a
 Ubiquitin protein ligase E3A
 Boeing E-3 Sentry, an American military aircraft
 Minamikyushu Expressway, route E3A in Japan.